The 1985 South African Open (also known as the 1985 Altech South African Open for sponsorship reasons) was a men's tennis tournament played on outdoor hard courts in Johannesburg, [South Africa that was part of the 1985 Nabisco Grand Prix. It was the 82nd edition of the tournament and was held from 7 through 13 October 1985. Unseeded Matt Anger won the singles title.

Finals

Singles
 Matt Anger defeated  Brad Gilbert 6–4, 3–6, 6–3, 6–2
 It was Anger's only singles title of his career.

Doubles
 Colin Dowdeswell /  Christo van Rensburg defeated  Amos Mansdorf /  Shahar Perkiss 3–6, 7–6, 6–4

References

External links
 ATP Tournament Profile
 ITF – Johannesburg Tournament Details

South African Open
South African Open (tennis)
Open
Sports competitions in Johannesburg
1980s in Johannesburg
October 1985 sports events in Africa